Tuzsér Erdért SE is a Hungarian football club located in Tuzsér, Hungary. It currently plays in Hungarian National Championship III. The team's colors are green and white.

Football clubs in Hungary
Association football clubs established in 1946
1946 establishments in Hungary